Rajeev Kumar is now at Jawaharlal Nehru University.  He is known for his fight with IITs to fix the eligibility criteria of admission through the JEE. 
A "protracted legal struggle" over years
with several tiers of the IIT administration, led to in 2010, the Delhi High Court ordering the IITs to reveal such information. Since 2012, every candidate gets a carbon copy of their paper, and the various cutoffs are announced.
Due to this activism he was suspended, then compulsorily retired by IIT Kharagpur in 2014; he was reinstated in 2017 by the President Pranab Mukherjee.

Suspension for whistleblowing
In 2011, Kumar was suspended for damaging the reputation of IIT Kharagpur by reporting the massive copying that goes on in the institute, and for exposing a scam in the purchase of laptop computers. The institute had also illegally accessed Kumar's phone records.
This led to noted Supreme Court lawyer and activist Prashant Bhushan asking the MHRD Minister Kapil Sibal to ensure that whistleblowers like Rajeev should not be harassed. Despite letters from the MHRD and the Central Vigilance Commission in 2013, IIT Kharagpur did not revoke the suspension. In July 2012, the registrar of IIT wrote to the ministry 
"saying the withdrawal of suspension of Prof. Kumar and resumption of duties
would adversely affect the academic atmosphere of the institute."

Finally, the suspension was lifted in May 2013,

References

Living people
Activists from West Bengal
Academic staff of IIT Kharagpur
Year of birth missing (living people)